Jeff Clements (born 1962) is an American attorney, author, and the co-founder and CEO of American Promise.  He is the author of Corporations Are Not People: Reclaiming Democracy From Big Money And Global Corporations. Since 2010, he has been one of the chief advocates for a 28th Amendment to overturn Citizens United v. FEC and allow the U.S. Congress and states to set reasonable limits on campaign spending in U.S. Elections.

Early life and education
Clements majored in Government at Colby College, graduating in 1984, he obtained his J.D. from Cornell Law School in 1988, graduating Magna Cum Laude.

Legal career
Hired by Massachusetts Attorney General Scott Harshbarger in 1996, Clements served as Assistant Attorney General of Massachusetts from 1996 to 2000 where he worked on Investigations and enforcement of deceptive trade practices, antitrust, and consumer protection laws.
Starting in 2006, Clements served as the Assistant Attorney General and Chief of the Public Protection Bureau in Massachusetts. In private practice, Jeff has been a partner at Mintz Levin in Boston, and in his own firm.

Advocacy work

In 2009, as a private attorney, Clements represented several public interest organizations with a U.S. Supreme Court amicus brief in the Citizens United case. Clements argued: "[w]hether or not the Supreme Court's decision in Citizens United explicitly addresses 'corporate rights' under the Constitution, a holding that overrules Austin and McConnell would rest on the remarkable - and erroneous - assumption that the Constitution provides corporations with First Amendment and Fourteenth Amendment rights equivalent to those of people for purposes of political expenditures." 

Following the U.S. Supreme Court ruling in Citizens United v. FEC, Clements and John Bonifaz founded Free Speech For People in 2010 to advocate for a 28th Amendment to overturn the Courts controversial 5–4 ruling.

In 2012, Jeff co-founded Whaleback Partners LLC, provides accessible start-up funding for farmers and businesses engaged in local, sustainable agriculture.

In 2016, Clements founded American Promise to accelerate the movement to win a 28th amendment by building cross partisan, grassroots infrastructure across the United States.

References

External links
American Promise
Corporations Are Not People
Whaleback Partners
AMICUS CURIAE BRIEF in Citizens United v. FEC

Massachusetts lawyers
20th-century American lawyers
21st-century American lawyers
Campaign finance reform in the United States
American political writers
1962 births
Living people
Cornell University alumni